The Ister-class frigates were a group of five 36-gun screw frigates ordered for the Royal Navy in the early 1860s.

Description
She was assessed as 2,486 tons Builder's Old Measurement and displaced 3,200 tons. She was fitted with 36 guns and had a complement of 450. Propulsion was by a 500 nhp steam engine, which was built by Napier & Sons, Glasgow. The engine drove a single screw propeller of  diameter and  pitch.

She was designed to take 36 guns, which were intended to comprise four 100 pounder, rifled muzzle-loading guns (weight 125 Cwt/6,350 kg each), fourteen 8-inch guns (65 Cwt/3,302 kg each), located on the maindeck; and nine 110-pounder breech-loading guns (82 Cwt/6,166 kg each) located on the upper deck. In August, it was reported that Endymion was then being fitted with three 110-pounder Armstrong guns, four 100-pounder Somerset guns and fourteen 8-inch guns.

Service

All five of the ships in the class were laid down in 1860–61 in various royal dockyards, but HMS Blonde and HMS Astrea were cancelled on 12 December 1863. HMS Dartmouth and HMS Ister were cancelled a year later, on 16 December 1864. None of these four ships were launched before they were cancelled.

On 1 February 1862, construction of Endymion was suspended on the orders of the Admiralty, although the Admiralty later decided that she would be completed. Construction restarted on 7 February 1864. Endymion was the last wooden frigate built at Deptford Dockyard. She was commissioned in 1866 and spent much of her service based at Malta. In 1869–70 she sailed around the world as part of a Flying Squadron. Endymion then served as a guard ship at Hull until 1879 and was lent to the Metropolitan Asylums Board in 1881 for use as an administration and hospital ship. She was sold out of service in 1885, and served as an administration ship until 1904. Endymion was sold in December 1904 and broken up in 1905.

Footnotes

References

Frigate classes
Frigates of the Royal Navy
Ship classes of the Royal Navy
Victorian-era frigates of the United Kingdom